Kyrylivka is an urban-type settlement in the Melitopol Raion of Zaporizhzhia Oblast in southern Ukraine. Administrative centre of Kyrylivka Hromada, which includes 7 more villages. Population: . The town is located on the northern coast of the Sea of Azov and surrounded by both  and Molochnyi Lyman. Some of its areas are part of Pryazovskyi National Nature Park.

History
The area was settled by Doukhobors in 1805. Kyrylo Kapustin became the first inhabitant and the village was named after him.

In 1838 the population of Kyrylivka increased to 130 people. After some time, local Doukhobors were sent to the Caucasus, except those who would return to Russian Orthodox Church.

In 1926 sanatorium "Kyrylivka" was founded after the mud bath clinic opened. From there on, Kyrylivka began to develop as a resort destination.

In 1968 the village received an urban-type settlement status.

In 2001 its population was 1,481 according to the census.

During the 2022 Russian invasion of Ukraine, Kyrylivka was occupied by Russian forces after the capture of Melitopol.

Gallery

References

External links
 krlk.gov.ua – Official website of Kyrylivka

Urban-type settlements in Melitopol Raion
Populated places established in 1805
1805 establishments in the Russian Empire
1805 establishments in Ukraine
Seaside resorts in Ukraine